Dendrophilia tetragama is a moth of the family Gelechiidae. It was described by Edward Meyrick in 1935. It is found on Java in Indonesia.

References

tetragama
Moths described in 1935